Geza de Kaplany (born June 27, 1926) is a Hungarian-born physician who emigrated to the United States in the late 1950s. In 1963, he was convicted of first-degree murder in California after mutilating his wife with a scalpel and corrosive strong acids, thus causing her death.

Early life
De Kaplany was born and raised in Hungary, in a wealthy family. He lost the sight in an eye during a beating by his father, who died in 1938. He studied medicine at the University of Szeged and graduated with honors in 1951. He went into practice in Budapest as a cardiologist, but clashed with officials in the Hungarian Revolution of 1956, fleeing after it failed. He visited England and Denmark, writing a book called Doctor in Revolt about his alleged experiences as a freedom fighter in Hungary.

He settled in Boston, intending to resume his practice, but discovered that his degree was not recognized. He retrained as an anesthesiologist, interning at :Milwaukee Hospital from August 1957 to August 1958. He then attended Harvard and taught anesthesiology at Yale. He moved to San Jose, California where he worked at San Jose Hospital.

Marriage

In June 1962, he met Hajna Piller, also from Hungary. She was 25, a former fashion model, showgirl at Bimbo's 365 Club and beauty queen, daughter of György Piller. The two had a whirlwind courtship and married that August. A few weeks after their marriage, de Kaplany heard from a woman friend that his wife was having an affair.

Murder
On the evening of August 28, 1962, de Kaplany carried out his plan to punish his wife for her supposed infidelity. He tied her to the bed in their apartment, played loud music and disfigured her body with a scalpel. He dabbed a mixture of hydrochloric, sulfuric and nitric acid in the cuts, causing her to suffer third degree corrosive burns over most of the front of her body. After three hours, he called police.  He told police that he had wanted to destroy her beauty, but not kill her. She recovered enough to give a statement, but died on September 30 in St. Francis Memorial Hospital.

Legal proceedings
De Kaplany's trial commenced on January 9, 1963. He was initially charged with attempted murder, and was later charged with murder by torture after his wife died. De Kaplany pleaded not guilty by reason of insanity. His lawyer, Edward de Vilbiss, claimed that he suffered from multiple personality disorder and that the crime was committed by his alter ego, "Pierre de la Roche." Prosecutor Louis P. Bergna brought a witness, Ruth Krueger, a former lover who testified otherwise. He was declared legally sane, though medically insane.

He was convicted of first-degree murder, but the testimony of a psychiatrist who claimed that de Kaplany had become a "paranoid schizophrenic with latent homosexual tendencies" because of abuse during his childhood apparently prompted the jury to bring a verdict of life imprisonment on March 1, 1963. Superior Court Judge Raymond G. Callaghan formally sentenced him on March 15. He was sent to California Institution for Men.

His license to practice was revoked by the California Board of Medical Examiners on March 9, 1964, for violating sections 2378 and 2383 (moral turpitude and unprofessional conduct) of the Business and Professions Code.

He appealed his conviction in the California state and federal courts, but the Ninth Circuit ultimately upheld his conviction in a 1976 opinion that issued after de Kaplany had already been granted parole and left the United States.

Parole

In 1975, de Kaplany was granted parole in a controversial decision marked by accusations that postmortem photographs of his victim were removed from his file by Raymond Procunier, the chairman of the California state parole authority for men, prior to review of de Kaplany's case by the parole board. As a result, the ability to be paroled while under the sentence of life imprisonment was removed.

The parole board under Procunier allowed de Kaplany to travel to Taiwan on November 13, 1975, to work as a medical missionary doctor serving poor patients in a Catholic hospital in Lutsao. De Kaplany left the United States before his prosecutors and the general public knew he had been paroled. Negative public reaction followed, with legislators calling for Procunier's ouster. Procunier resigned the following year, citing "personal reasons".

De Kaplany worked at the Lutsao clinic for the next four years, and remarried. Tired of constant parole checks, he left Taiwan in late 1979 and dropped out of sight. When California corrections officials discovered he was missing, a warrant was issued for his arrest and his name was submitted to Interpol. However, a 2002 investigation by the San Jose Mercury News indicated that California officials were made aware of de Kaplany's whereabouts several times over the next few years, and once even contacted him to warn him, as required by law, about an anonymous threat on his life, yet failed to take any steps to extradite him.

Later life

He re-surfaced briefly in Munich, Germany in December 1980, where a hospital fired him from a staff position after a German women's magazine happened to publish an article on infamous crimes including his case.

For a time in 1983, he worked in the U.S. Army Health Clinic in Grafenwöhr, Bavaria.

In 2002, reporters for the San Jose Mercury News located the 75-year-old de Kaplany and interviewed him at his home in Bad Zwischenahn, Germany.  Two years prior, he had become a naturalized German citizen, making it impossible to extradite him for the parole violation.

References

External links
CRIA image search (Trial-related images)
 

1926 births
Living people
University of Szeged alumni
Harvard University alumni
Yale University faculty
Hungarian people imprisoned abroad
Prisoners sentenced to life imprisonment by California
Hungarian people convicted of murder
Hungarian prisoners sentenced to life imprisonment
People convicted of murder by California
People paroled from life sentence
Hungarian cardiologists
American anesthesiologists
Hungarian emigrants to the United States
Naturalized citizens of Germany
20th-century Hungarian physicians
1962 murders in the United States